Eutaw is a ghost town in Bolivar County, Mississippi, United States.  The settlement had a port on the Mississippi River called "Eutaw Landing."

The community was located on the Eutaw Plantation, and included a post office, store, church, and cemetery. A post office operated under the name Eutaw from 1890 to 1952.

The former community is covered by farmfield and a portion of the Mississippi Levee; the only remnant is the Eutaw Cemetery.

References

Former populated places in Bolivar County, Mississippi
Former populated places in Mississippi
Mississippi populated places on the Mississippi River
Mississippi placenames of Native American origin